This is a list of hospitals in Estonia.

External links
East Tallinn Central Hospital official website in Estonian

Estonia
Hospitals

Estonia